St Francis De Sales School may refer to:

 St Francis de Sales School, Dhemaji, Assam, India
 St. Francis De Sales School (New Delhi), India
 St Francis De Sales School, in Island Bay, New Zealand
 St. Francis de Sales School (Toledo, Ohio), U.S.

See also
 St. Francis De Sales College
 St. Francis de Sales High School (disambiguation)
 St. Francis De Sales Regional Catholic School